Travel Town Museum is a railway museum dedicated on December 14, 1952, and located in the northwest corner of Los Angeles, California's Griffith Park. The history of railroad transportation in the western United States from 1880 to the 1930s is the primary focus of the museum's collection, with an emphasis on railroading in Southern California and the Los Angeles area.

History 

In the late 1940s, Charley Atkins, a Recreation and Parks employee, and some rail enthusiasts came up with the plan that a full-size steam locomotive would be an attractive addition to the miniature railroad ride at Griffith Park. The City of Los Angeles Harbor Department had two small locomotives destined for scrap that seemed to be suitable for this purpose. These locomotives had worked at a quarry on Santa Catalina Island, California, carrying stone to be used building breakwaters for the Port of Los Angeles. With the support of former Recreation and Parks Department General Manager George Hjelte and Superintendent of Recreation William Frederickson, Atkins initiated contacts with major railroads in California to ask what equipment they could donate. At that time, the steam locomotive era was drawing to a close, and Atkins found a good response. The earliest locomotives were made accessible for children to climb on them. Travel Town was inaugurated on December 14, 1952, in an area used as a prisoner-of-war camp during World War II. The locomotives were accessible day and night until fencing was installed in 1955 to prevent vandals from breaking glass windows and gauges. A Union Pacific Railroad dining car donated in 1954 was available for birthday parties. In 1965, Travel Town's exhibits were regrouped and the park was rededicated. Today, Travel Town is in a state of new growth and development.

Railway collection
The railroad museum portion contains 43 full-scale railroad engines, cars and other rolling stock.

Exhibits

Motor vehicles
Railway Express Agency, 1945 International Harvester Co. & York Body Corp. Model K-5 Express Delivery Truck.

Additional railway museum collections and examples
Semaphore by Union Switch & Signal, Swissvale, Pennsylvania.
Wig-Wag grade crossing signal (unknown builder, perhaps Pacific Electric signal shops) from Pacific Electric Railroad.
Track Construction - Examples of three periods of  track construction, and wheels on axle.
Log sleepers (ties) nailed to  rail. Earliest method.
Sleepers, uniform and square cut wood soaked in creosote preservative and surrounded by ballast, spiked to  'T' rail which is joined with fishplates.
Concrete sleepers, spring clipped to rail which is joined with welds.
Track switches - Various examples of switch points methods, frogs and switch stands/signals.

Train excursions
Tickets can be purchased to ride the Travel Town Railroad, a  gauge miniature railway for two circles around the museum grounds. This railway originally ran a train known as the Melody Ranch Special, which was once owned by Gene Autry. Its namesake originates from the Gene Autry film Melody Ranch.  The passenger coaches are now covered and the original steam engine (which was vandalized beyond economical repair) has been replaced with Courage, a chain-driven internal combustion motor housed within a façade representing a steam locomotive.  This railroad is one of three miniature railway train rides within Griffith Park. The others are the  gauge Griffith Park & Southern Railroad and the  gauge miniature railway at the Los Angeles Live Steamers Railroad Museum. The latter is independently operated.

Exhibit room
Artifacts, documents, and ephemera are on display such as menus and chinaware, recollections and timetables, regarding the history of railroading in the United States.

Main exhibit hall
Houses additional transportation examples and exhibits.
Cut-away boiler demonstration exhibit.
Hand drawn fire-hose cart.
Horse-drawn wagons
Piano Box buggy
Coal Box buggy
Milk delivery dray
milk delivery van
chariot from Ben-Hur.
Circus Wagon
Oil Delivery (tank) wagon
Motor Vehicles & Automobiles.
Packard Sedan, 9th series, circa 1932
1948 Nash Ambassador Sedan
1918 Mack Dump Truck
Fire Engine
"Holden's Corner" railway safety interactive Children's Discovery Center.
The "Little General" locomotive demonstration engine.
Viewing platform for the East Valley Lines model railroad club N scale layout.

East Valley Lines
Located behind a roll-up door in the main exhibit hall, the East Valley Lines Model Rail-Road N Gauge Club operates their extensive layout.

Appearances in media
Travel Town is near many television and movie studios, which has prompted those production companies to include scenes requiring railroad equipment to be shot at Travel Town since it opened.

A small sample of the thousands of Travel Town's screen appearances is represented below:

 The Monkees Episode 31 "Monkees at the Movies" (1967)
 Adam-12 Episode 101 "Eyewitness" (1972)
 The Parallax View (1974: Griffith Park & Southern Railroad miniature train scene)
 Columbo "Identity Crisis" (1975)
 The band Foreigner's music video "Cold as Ice" (1977) 
 The band Foreigner's music video "Feels Like the First Time" (1977) 
 CHiPs Episode 109 "Silent Partner" (1982)
 Knight Rider Episode 36 "Diamonds Aren't a Girl's Best Friend" (1983)
 Dallas (1978 TV series) Season 10, Episode 19 "High Noon for Calhoun" (1987)
 Quantum Leap Episode 48 "A Hunting Will We Go" (1991)
 Kidsongs: "Play-along Songs" – "Down by the Station" (1993, direct-to-video)
 Royal Crown Revue's "Watts Local" music video was shot in several locations (1999) 
 Six Feet Under Season 4 Episode 8 "Coming and Going" (2004)
 Ghost Whisperer Season 5, Episode 9 "Lost in the Shadows" (2009)
 Good Guys Wear Black 1977 film starring Chuck Norris.
 Close Enough Season 1, Episode 2B “Room Parents” (2020)
 The Sarah Silverman Program Season 2, Episode 5 “Ah, Men” (2007)

Former Exhibits
Over the course of its history, the museum collection has expanded and contracted as donations were made available, items loaned or returned, items traded, and more suitable homes found for items in the collection. As the museum's central theme is railroading and transportation in Los Angeles, a number of notable collections have found new homes after lengthy stays at the museum.

Fire Engines
The large collection of fire engines and associated apparatus was transferred from Travel Town to the new Los Angeles Fire Fighting Museum in Hollywood in 2002. The interior space formerly occupied by the fire apparatus collection became the new home for wooden narrow gauge railroad cars formerly used in the Owens Valley, 250 miles northeast of Los Angeles. The three cars, a railway post office car, a boxcar, and a stock car, had been on display outside for over 40 years.

Aircraft
The museum transferred its military aircraft collection to other museums in the late 1980s into the 1990s. The Vought F7U-3 Cutlass was traded to the National Naval Aviation Museum at Naval Air Station Pensacola, Florida. Two aircraft, the Airborne early warning and control Lockheed P2V-3 Neptune and Grumman F9F-2 Panther, were traded to a museum near Fresno, California in 1992. A small rocket similar to the German V-1 flying bomb was transferred to Vandenberg Air Force Base. A German World War II airplane engine was returned to its owner in 1988.

References

Bibliography

External links

Travel Town Museum (official web site)
Liste der Lokomotiven
Travel Town Museum Foundation
"Paradise for Casey Jones Jr. Popular Mechanics, April 1956, pp. 142–143
 www.rgusrail.com

1952 establishments in California
Griffith Park
Landmarks in Los Angeles
Miniature railroads in the United States
Museums established in 1952
Museums in Los Angeles
Open-air museums in California
Railroad museums in California